Sicilian revolt can refer to a number of military conflicts involving Sicily, including:
First Servile War (135–132 BC) against Roman rule.
Second Servile War (104-100 BC) against Roman rule.
Sicilian Vespers (1282) against Angevin rule and the subsequent War of the Sicilian Vespers (1282-1301).
Sicilian revolution of 1848 against Bourbon rule.